The Wangkangurru, also written Wongkanguru and Wangkanguru, are an Aboriginal Australian people of the Simpson Desert area in the state of South Australia. They also refer to themselves as Nharla.

Country
To the east they were at Macumba Creek. The Wangkangurru were also present on the lower reaches of the Finke River. The southern section of the Arunta (Simpson) Desert also formed part of their territory, while to the southeast, their boundaries ran as far as Kallakoopah Creek and the Warburton River. Blood Creek and Atna Hill also lay on Wangkangurru lands.

Native title
The Wangkangurru now form an aggregate with the Yarluyandi, and are represented by the Wangkangurru Yarluyandi Aboriginal Corporation. Their native title over a large area of the Simpson Desert was recognised in 2014.

Language

The Wangkangurru language, like the majority of Aboriginal Australian languages, falls into the Pama-Nyungan classification.

The self-referential term Nharla, relating to their language subgroup, is the Arabana word for "man".

Notable people
 Mick McLean (Irinyili) b.1888-d.1977) was an outstanding "man of high degree" (minpari), whose erudition regarding the country, languages and culture of northern South Australia - the traditional song cycles and lore extending from the Simpson Desert and Dalhousie in the north to Port Augusta and Murnpeowie in the south, from the westernly Indulkana eastwards as far as Innamincka was highly prized by ethnographers such as Luise Hercus. Aside from English, he was fluent in five Aboriginal languages, a master of Wangkangurru, Arabana and the southern variety of Arrernte, as well as exhibiting a competency in both Diyari and Antakarinya.

Some words
 minparu (Man of high degree/clever man/medicine man)

Alternative names
 Wangkanguru (Yankuntjatjarra pronunciation)
 Wongkongaru, Wonkanguru, Wonkonguru
 Ongkongura
 Wongkaooroo, Wonkgongaru, Wonkongaru, Wonkaoora
 Wongonooroo Wonkongnuru, Wonkagnurra, Wonkanooroo.
 Unganoora
 Känguru (abbreviation)
 Gongaru
 Partama (Gugadja exonym)
 Wingkungira (Iliaura exonym).

Notes

Citations

Sources

External links 

 Kuungkari, Bidjara, Inangai & Wangkangurru (Central West Region) community language journey digital story, at State Library of Queensland

Aboriginal peoples of South Australia